Charles Harrison Culph (24 October 1920 – 5 October 2007) was an Australian rules footballer who played with South Melbourne in the Victorian Football League (VFL).

Culph, a forward, was South Melbourne's leading goal-kicker in the 1943 VFL season. He kicked 35 goals from his 11 appearances that year, with a best of six goals in a win over Melbourne at Punt Road Oval.

He returned to his original club, Port Melbourne, in 1945 and remained with the club until his retirement in 1951, playing 117 games. Culph was a member of their 1947 premiership team and topped their goal-kicking in 1949.

References

External links
 
 

1920 births
Australian rules footballers from Victoria (Australia)
Sydney Swans players
Port Melbourne Football Club players
2007 deaths